Tyndaris is a genus of "jewel beetles" in the subfamily Polycestinae, containing the following species:

 Tyndaris marginella Fairmaire & Germain, 1858
 Tyndaris patagiata (Berg, 1885)
 Tyndaris planata (Laporte & Gory, 1835)

References

Buprestidae genera